Last Judgement is a 1549 tempera on panel painting by Marcello Venusti after Michelangelo's Sistine Chapel The Last Judgement (1541). It is now in the National Museum of Capodimonte in Naples.

It was commissioned by cardinal Alessandro Farnese, who wanted a copy of Michelangelo's work for his family collection. It was moved to Naples with the rest of the collection at the end of the 18th century.

Sources
https://web.archive.org/web/20161126194454/http://www.cir.campania.beniculturali.it/itinerari-tematici/nei-siti-culturali/GRPT_INT3/T_INT22/OA900123
Mariella Utili e Barbara Maria Savy, Museo di Capodimonte - La Galleria Farnese: dipinti italiani, Napoli, Electa Editore, 1999, .
Mario Sapio, Il Museo di Capodimonte, Napoli, Arte'm, 2012. 
Touring Club Italiano, Museo di Capodimonte, Milano, Touring Club Editore, 2012. 

1549 paintings
Paintings in the collection of the Museo di Capodimonte
Farnese Collection